Florijan Debenjak (born 1 March 1969) is a retired Slovenian football defender and later manager.

References

1969 births
Living people
Slovenian footballers
Association football defenders
ND Gorica players
Slovenian PrvaLiga players
Slovenian football managers